During the 1976–77 season, Heart of Midlothian F.C. competed in the Scottish Premier Division, the Scottish Cup, the Scottish League Cup, the European Cup Winners' Cup and the East of Scotland Shield.

Fixtures

Friendlies

East of Scotland Shield

European Cup Winners' Cup

League Cup

Scottish Cup

Scottish Premier Division

Scottish Premier Division table

Squad information

|}

See also
List of Heart of Midlothian F.C. seasons

References

Statistical Record 76–77

External links
Official Club website

Heart of Midlothian F.C. seasons
Heart of Midlothian